Ichneutica lithias is a moth of the family Noctuidae. This species is endemic to New Zealand. It is a small moth but distinctive as a result of the markings on its forewings. Although this species is widespread in the South Island, it has only been collected in the Rangipo Desert in the North Island. The species prefers habitat that is scrubland ranging in altitude from coastal to alpine. Adults are on the wing from October to April and larvae have been collected and reared on the New Zealand endemic plant species Melicytus alpinus.

Taxonomy 
This species was first described by Edward Meyrick in 1887 from two specimens collected at Castle Hill near Christchurch by J. D. Enys. Meyrick originally named the species Mamestra lithias. The lectotype of the species is male and is held at the Canterbury Museum in the Fereday Collection. In 1988 J. S. Dugdale placed this species within the Graphania genus. In 2019 Robert Hoare undertook a major review of New Zealand Noctuidae. During this review the genus Ichneutica was greatly expanded and the genus Graphania was subsumed into that genus as a synonym. As a result of this review, this species is now known as Ichneutica lithias.

Description 

Meyrick described the species as follows:
This is a small moth with the male having a wingspan of between 28 and 35 mm and the female of between 33 and 38 mm. It is unlikely to be confused with closely related species as it has distinctive kidney shaped and circular marks on its forewings that are ringed in white.

Distribution 
It is endemic to New Zealand. This species is found in the North Island only in the Rangipo Desert. However it is widespread in the South Island.

Habitat 
In the South Island this species inhabits shrublands ranging from coastal to alpine zones. In the North Island this species has been collected in native forest in the Rangipo Desert amongst volcanic dunes.

Behaviour 
The adults of this species are on the wing from October to April.

Life history and host species 

The larvae of this species has yet to be described. Larvae have been collected and reared on Melicytus alpinus.

References

Moths described in 1887
Hadeninae
Moths of New Zealand
Endemic fauna of New Zealand
Taxa named by Edward Meyrick
Endemic moths of New Zealand